Atkinson Mills is a census-designated place located in Wayne Township, Mifflin County in the state of Pennsylvania, United States.  It is located along U.S. Route 522 in southern Mifflin County, between the boroughs of Mount Union and McVeytown.  As of the 2010 census,  the population was 174 residents.

Demographics

References

Census-designated places in Mifflin County, Pennsylvania
Census-designated places in Pennsylvania